WHJC-LP, virtual and UHF digital channel 27, is a low-powered television station licensed to Williamson, West Virginia, United States. The station is owned by Four Winds Television.

The station's transmitter is located on Buffalo Mountain, located in Mingo County, West Virginia. The signal mainly covers the southern portions of the Huntington-Charleston media market.

Digital channels
The station's digital signal is multiplexed:

References

External links

HJC-LP
Retro TV affiliates
Low-power television stations in the United States
Television channels and stations established in 1994
1994 establishments in West Virginia